The third in the series of color developing agents used in developing color films, commonly known as CD-3, is chemically known as N-[2-[(4-Amino-3-methylphenyl)ethylamino]ethyl]methanesulfonamide Sesquisulfate Monohydrate.  In color development, after reducing a silver atom in a silver halide crystal, the oxidized developing agent combines with a color coupler to form a color dye molecule.  CD-3 is used in many processes including VNF-1
and the E-6 process.

See also
 Color Developing Agent 1
 Color Developing Agent 2
 Color Developing Agent 4

References

Photographic chemicals
Anilines